Satisfaction approval voting (SAV) is an electoral system that extends the concept of approval voting to a multiple winner election. It was proposed by Steven Brams and Marc Kilgour in 2010.

Description

Satisfaction approval voting aims to maximise the electorate's satisfaction, rather like proportional approval voting (PAV), however SAV calculates a voter's satisfaction differently to the way used in PAV. The satisfaction gained by a voter when a candidate they approve of is elected is equal to 1/n where n is the number of candidates that they voted for. This has the effect of giving everyone a single vote that they split between the n candidates that they vote for. This makes calculating the winners much easier than for PAV, as a voter's satisfaction gained for each elected candidate under this method is independent of how many of their choices have been elected, making satisfaction additive.

Example

There are 10 voters, 4 candidates (Alice, Bob, Carol and Dan) and 2 seats. The votes are:

 4 voters vote for both Alice and Bob (each of these two candidates with get half a vote from each of these four voters).
 3 voters vote only for Carol (this candidate gets a whole vote from each of these three voters).
 3 voters vote only for Dan (this candidate gets a whole vote from each of these three voters).

Using the methodology used in PAV:

Therefore C and D win.

Alternatively, making use of the system's additive satisfaction property:

Comparison to approval voting 
SAV tends to elect committees that better represent the diversity of voters than AV. SAV is also less susceptible to manipulation by candidate-cloning: if a winning candidate is cloned (such that the same voters who vote for the original candidate also vote for the clone), then in AV, both the original candidate and the clone will have the same score as the original candidate had before the cloning, so the clone will win and displace a winner with a lower score (if any). In contrast, in SAV, both the original and the clone will have a lower score (due to the division of each voter's vote by the number of approved candidates), so it is less likely to displace another winner.

In party-approval voting 
Party-approval voting is a special case of approval voting in which each voter can approve one or more parties, rather than directly approving candidates. SAV can be applied to this setting as follows.

 For each party, compute its upper quota - the fraction of votes it received, times the total number of seats, rounded up.
 For each voter, define the satisfaction score as the number of seats allocated to his approved party divided by the upper-quota of this party.
 Allocate to each party either its upper-quota or its lower-quota; choose the set of parties receiving their upper-quota in a way that maximizes the voter satisfaction.

When every voter votes for a single party, the result that maximizes voter satisfaction coincides with the Quota method of Balinsky and Young - a quota-capped variant of D'Hondt method of apportionment; hence, it satisfies both upper and lower quota.

References

Semi-proportional electoral systems
Cardinal electoral systems
Approval voting